William McGregor (1 December 1923 – November 2015) was a Scottish professional footballer who played in the Football League for Leicester City and Mansfield Town.

References

1923 births
2015 deaths
Scottish footballers
Association football defenders
English Football League players
Leicester City F.C. players
Mansfield Town F.C. players
Corby Town F.C. players